The CBB O2 (often styled O²) is a family of French ultralight trikes, designed by Bruno Bouron and produced by CBB ULM of Montreuil-Bellay. The aircraft is supplied complete and ready to fly.

Design and development

The aircraft design features a cable-braced hang glider-style high wing supported by a curved mount, weight-shift controls, a two-seats-in-tandem open cockpit with a small cockpit fairing, tricycle landing gear with wheel pants and a single engine in pusher configuration.

The aircraft is made from bolted-together aluminum tubing, with its double-surface wing covered in Dacron sailcloth. Its  span wing is supported by a single tube-type kingpost and uses an "A" frame weight-shift control bar. The powerplant is a twin-cylinder, liquid-cooled, two-stroke, dual-ignition  Rotax 582 engine or a four-cylinder, air- and liquid-cooled, four-stroke, dual-ignition  Rotax 912UL engine. At one time the twin-cylinder, air-cooled, four-stroke, dual-ignition  HKS 700E engine was offered, but its use on the O2 had been discontinued by 2015. By 2018 the HKS powerplant had returned as an option.

An improved model of the basic O2 carriage is the O2B.

A number of different wings can be fitted to the basic carriage, including the standard La Mouette Oryx.

Variants
O2 582 Oryx 14
Model powered by a twin cylinder, liquid-cooled, two-stroke, dual-ignition  Rotax 582 engine and equipped with a La Mouette Oryx wing.
O2 SW 582
Economical model powered by a twin-cylinder, liquid-cooled, two-stroke, dual-ignition  Rotax 582 engine.
O2 SW 912
Model powered by a four-cylinder, air and liquid-cooled, four-stroke, dual-ignition  Rotax 912UL engine and equipped with a La Mouette Oryx wing.
O2B HKS Light
Model powered by a twin-cylinder, air-cooled, four-stroke, dual-ignition  HKS 700E engine and equipped with a La Mouette wing.
O2B HKS SW
Model with options as standard for cross-country flying, powered by a twin-cylinder, air-cooled, four-stroke, dual-ignition  HKS 700E engine and equipped with a La Mouette wing.
O2B 582
Model powered by a twin-cylinder, liquid-cooled, two-stroke, dual-ignition  Rotax 582 engine.
O2B 912
Model powered by a four-cylinder, air- and liquid-cooled, four-stroke, dual-ignition  Rotax 912UL engine.

Specifications (O2 SW 582)

References

External links

O2
2010s French sport aircraft
2010s French ultralight aircraft
Single-engined pusher aircraft
Ultralight trikes